Bhalobashar Shohor (The city of love) is a Bengali short film of India. The film was released in July, 2017. Bangladesh actress Jaya Ahsan, Ritwick Chakraborty, Sohini Sarkar and Arun Mukherjee played the lead role in film. The film was directed by Indraniel Roy Chowdhury.

Cast
 Jaya Ahsan
 Ritwick Chakraborty
 Sohini Sarkar 
 Arun Mukherjee

Release
This short film is released by director YouTube and Vimeo   release in 2017.

Plot
The love of Adil Haider and Annapurna Das drags them into one of the beautiful Syrian city Homs. Muslim, Hindi speaking Adil, and Hindu, Bengali-speaking Annapurna. The beautiful, two thousand year old city of Homs, is in war, bomb, grenade, cannonball. Like many places in the Middle East- Afghanistan, Iraq, Iran, Syria were destroyed. Destruction with him was the life of Adil and Annapurna. Adil was lying in Syria, hit by bomb. Annapurna came back to her old town in Kolkata, where Adil and she first met a few years ago, she loved him.

The beginning of the new battle for Annapurna is the life of Annapurna. She is not fighting the war gun cannon bomber. She fights economic war, social war. The poor young girl has a life of 14-hours school attendance on the day of the mother, and at the same time the women of high-tech society go to her house to get massage. Where temptation, lust, dignity and nerve war with eyesight. Where the hope of surviving the child's child in the shelter of an old father. Hope for her to be healed for the wounded forever, the hope of recovering the body. And the question of Adil, who has left the same, is expected to reach him on the basis of the bureaucracy, and see him once alive.

Reaction
The film is available on YouTube and Vimeo after its release. Many film artists and researchers mention the significance of the film and the message of society.

References

Bengali-language Indian films
2010s Bengali-language films